Courcelles is a commune in the southwestern French department of Charente-Maritime.

Geography
The village lies on the right bank of the Boutonne, which forms most of the commune's eastern border.

Population

See also
 Communes of the Charente-Maritime department

References

External links
 

Communes of Charente-Maritime